Le Bec-Hellouin is a commune in the department of Eure in the Normandy region in northern France.

It is best known for Bec Abbey and has recently been voted one of the "most beautiful villages of France".
The current mayor is Pascal Finet who replaced Jean-Paul Vittecoq in 2014.

History
Bec Abbey was founded in 1034 by Herluin, who was a knight at the court of Brionne and a Benedictine. Near to the abbey, in the village, the church, dedicated to Saint-André, was built in 1039. The original church burned down in 1264. It was rebuilt but damaged during the Hundred Years' War (1417). The nave and the bell tower were reconstructed in the 18th century.

In 1791 the abbey was closed because of the French Revolution and the departing monks transferred many statues to the village church; even the tomb of Herluin was moved to the church in 1792. From 1792 to 1794 bells and valuable decorative objects were removed from the church and finally brought to Bernay.

The windows of the church were destroyed during the bombing of Le Bec-Hellouin on 13 August 1944, in the course of World War II. The new windows were made in 1959. The Benedictine monks returned in 1948 and the tomb of Herluin was moved back to the abbey in 1959.

Etymology
Known as Beccensis Ecclesia in 1041 and in Beccus Herlevini 1160. The village takes its name from the Scandinavian word for creek mouth (bekkr). While Hellouin refers to Blessed Herluin, founder of the nearby abbey. whose name is of Germanic origin.

Notable people
Arnost, bishop of Rochester, England, 1076

Landmarks
Abbey of Bec-Hellouin.
Monastery of Saint Francesca Romana
St. Andrew's Church
The village has a set of typical half-timbered houses, grouped around the Abbey Our Lady of Bec.

Population

Further reading

See also
Communes of the Eure department

References

External links

 Official site
 Site for Bec Abbey

Communes of Eure
Plus Beaux Villages de France